The following is a list of honours and awards received by Kofi Annan.

List

Honours
1999: Honorary Silver Medal of Jan Masaryk
1999: Ceremonial first pitch, Game 3 of the World Series
2000: Companion of the Order of the Star of Ghana
2000: Grand Cross Order of Merit of the Republic of Poland
2001: Grand Cross with Collar of the Order of the Star of Romania
2002: Title of Busumuru, Honour of the Asante Empire 
2002: Knight Commander of the Most Courteous Order of Lesotho
2005: Grand Collar of the Order of Liberty (Portugal)
2006: Knight Grand Cross of the Order of the Netherlands Lion
2007: Grand Decoration of Honour in Gold with Sash for Services to the Republic of Austria
2007: Honorary Knight Grand Cross of the Order of St Michael and St George (GCMG) from Queen Elizabeth II (UK)
2008: Grand Cross 1st class of the Order of Merit of the Federal Republic of Germany

2013: Grand Officer of the Legion of Honour

Awards
2000: Kora All Africa Music Awards in the category of Lifetime Achievement
2001: Nobel Foundation, The Nobel Peace Prize, jointly presented to Kofi Annan and the United Nations
2002: Profiles in Courage Award.
2002: The American Whig-Cliosophic Society James Madison Award for Distinguished Public Service.
2003: Foreign Honorary Member of the American Academy of Arts and Sciences
2003: Freedom Prize of the Max Schmidheiny Foundation at the University of St. Gallen
2004: Freedom medal
2006: International World Order of Culture, Science and Education, Award of the European Academy of Informatization, All 
Belgium
2006: IPS International Achievement Award.
2006: Olof Palme Prize
2007: Wooden Crossbow, special award from the Swiss World Economic Forum
2007: People in Europe Award of Verlagsgruppe Passau
2007: MacArthur Foundation, MacArthur Award for International Justice 
2007: North-South Prize of the Council of Europe
2008: Harvard University Honors Prize
2008: Gottlieb Duttweiler Award
2008: Peace of Westphalia Prize
2008: Open Society Award – CEU Business School Budapest.
2011: Gothenburg Award
2012: Confucius Peace Prize

Honorary degrees
 Kwame Nkrumah University of Science and Technology, (Kumasi), Honorary Doctor of Science, 24 August 1998
 United Nations Mandated University for Peace, Honorary President, 1999
 Lund University, Honorary Doctor of Law, 1999
 National University of Ireland, Doctor of Law, 22 January 1999
 Technische Universität Dresden, doctor honoris causa, 27 April 1999
 Howard University, honorary doctorate of humane letters, 8 May 1999
 Comenius University in Bratislava, doctor honoris causa, 14 July 1999
 University of Michigan, Doctor of Laws, honoris causa, 3 May 1999
 University of Notre Dame, Doctor of Letters, honoris causa, 21 May 2000
 Seton Hall University, John C. Whitehead School of Diplomacy and International Relations, Honorary Doctorate, February 2001
 Brown University, Doctor of Laws, honoris causa, 28 May 2001
 Liberty Medal International Selection Commission, Liberty Medal, 4 July 2001
 Free University of Berlin, doctor honoris causa, 13 July 2001
 Tilburg University, Honorary Doctorate, 2002
 University of Alcalá, Doctor Honoris Causa, 9 April 2002
 Northwestern University, Doctor of Laws, 21 June 2002
 University of Pittsburgh, honorary Doctor of Public and International Affairs degree 21 October 2003
 Ghent University (Belgium), doctor honoris causa 21 March 2003
 Harvard University, 2004
 Carleton University, Legum Doctor, honoris causa, 9 March 2004
 University of Ottawa, Doctor of the University Degree, 9 March 2004
 University of Pennsylvania, Doctor of Laws, honoris causa, 16 May 2005 
 Universidade Nova de Lisboa, doctor honoris causa, 12 October 2005
 The George Washington University, Doctor of Public Service, 5 May 2006
 University of Tokyo, Honorary Doctorate, 18 May 2006
 Georgetown University, Doctor of Humane Letters, honoris causa, 30 October 2006
 University of St. Gallen, Switzerland, Max Schmidheiny Foundation Freedom Prize (originally awarded 2003, but postponed due to Annan's illness), 18 November 2006
 Princeton University, Crystal Tiger Award, 28 November 2006
 Uppsala University, receiver of the Uppsala University Linnaeus Medal in gold, 23 May 2007, and doctor honoris causa 26 May 2007
 King's College London, Doctor of Laws, honoris causa, 28 May 2008
 University of Neuchâtel, Honorary Doctorate, 1 November 2008
 Glasgow Caledonian University, Doctor of Laws, 18 November 2011

References

Kofi Annan
Annan, Kofi